Ro-44 was an Imperial Japanese Navy Kaichū type submarine of the K6 sub-class. Completed and commissioned in September 1943, she served in the central Pacific Ocean during World War II and was sunk in June 1944 during her second war patrol.

Design and description
The submarines of the K6 sub-class were versions of the preceding K5 sub-class with greater range and diving depth. They displaced  surfaced and  submerged.

For surface running, the boats were powered by two  diesel engines, each driving one propeller shaft. When submerged each propeller was driven by a  electric motor. They could reach  on the surface and  underwater.

The boats were armed with four internal bow  torpedo tubes and carried a total of ten torpedoes. They were also armed with a single  L/40 anti-aircraft gun and two single  AA guns.

Construction and commissioning

Ro-44 was laid down as Submarine No. 385 on 14 February 1942 by Mitsui Zosensho at Tamano, Japan. On 1 November 1942, she was renamed Ro-44, and she was attached provisionally to the Maizuru Naval District that day. She was launched on 11 November 1942 and was completed and commissioned on 13 September 1943.

Service history

September 1943–January 1944
Upon commissioning, Ro-44 was attached formally to the Maizuru Naval District and assigned to Submarine Squadron 11 for workups. During her work-ups, the commander of Submarine Squadron 11, Rear Admiral Noboru Ishizaki, arranged for her to test an experimental air-search radar borrowed from Kure Naval Air Station in the Iyo-nada in the Seto Inland Sea on 13 and 14 November 1943. After Ishizaki reported the results of the tests, he was rebuffed because he conducted them without the approval of the Navy Technical Department. Later in November 1943, Ro-44 moved from Kure to Maizuru.

On 25 December 1943, Ro-44 was reassigned to Submarine Division 34 in the 6th Fleet. She departed Maizuru in company with the submarine  on 28 December 1943 bound for the Nechap submarine base at Truk, which she reached on 6 January 1944. She brought aboard provisions from the auxiliary submarine tender  there on 12 January 1944.

First war patrol

Assigned a patrol area off Espiritu Santo in the New Hebrides, Ro-44 got underway from Truk at 16:30 on 15 January 1944, exiting the lagoon via South Pass to begin her first war patrol. While she was at sea, United States Navy Task Force 58 conducted Operation Hailstone, a major attack on Truk by carrier aircraft supported by anti-shipping sweeps around the atoll by surface warships, on 17 and 18 February 1944. At 22:14 on 18 February 1944, while on the surface  from Dublon and bearing 066 degrees from the island, she sighted two unidentified aircraft and submerged. She reported the encounter in a message she transmitted at 22:55, which Fleet Radio Unit, Melbourne (FRUMEL), an Allied signals intelligence unit headquartered at Melbourne, Australia, intercepted, decrypted, and reported on 19 February 1944. On 21 February 1944, Ro-44 concluded her patrol, returning to Truk and anchoring off the Nechap submarine base.

Mili supply runs

On 28 February 1944, Ro-44 departed Truk to make a supply run to Mili Atoll in the Marshall Islands, carrying food in rubber containers tied down on her afterdeck, 25-mm anti-aircraft ammunition, mail, and a set of new codebooks for the garrison. Shortly after departure, however, all of the rubber containers went overboard in heavy seas and were lost, and Ro-44 returned to Truk.

On 2 March 1944, Ro-44 again left Truk, carrying 11 metric tons of food and ammunition and with orders to deliver her cargo to Mili and then conduct a reconnaissance of the U.S. fleet anchorage at Majuro during her return voyage to Truk. She had passed Jaluit and was approaching Mili from the west after dark on 9 March 1944 when she sighted a southeast-bound U.S. Navy task force made up of two aircraft carriers, a battleship, and a cruiser. She began an approach at 17:45 JST, but was too far away to launch an attack. She surfaced and pursued the ships for about an hour before losing contact. She sighted six U.S. destroyers at around 20:00 and submerged.

Ro-44 arrived off Mili on 11 March 1944, surfaced after dark, and entered the lagoon. She discharged her cargo, embarked 17 passengers, and quickly got back underway. As she approached Majuro on 13 March 1944 to conduct her reconnaissance, she sighted a red light ahead at 01:00 and submerged. As she closed on the atoll, she saw additional lights, leading her commanding officer to conclude that U.S. forces had constructed an airfield at Majuro. He then observed an aircraft carrier, eight battleships and several tank landing craft inside the lagoon. Ro-44 left the area at dawn on 13 March and later that day reported what she had seen to Truk. She arrived at Truk on 29 March 1944.

April–May 1944

After Japanese forces reported an Allied task force off Kavieng on New Britain, Ro-44 departed Truk to operate in a holding area south of Truk to await further orders. She returned to Truk on 15 April 1944.

On 17 April 1944, 16 United States Army Air Forces (USAAF) B-24 Liberators raided Truk, and Ro-44 and the submarine  submerged in the lagoon to avoid attack. Both submarines suffered minor damage from near-misses. On 20 April 1944, 17 USAAF B-24s attacked the anchorage, and Ro-44 and the other submarines present again submerged. When Ro-44 surfaced, her crew discovered that she had suffered periscope damage that could only be repaired in Japan. She departed Truk the same day bound for Kure, and soon was strafed by an American plane, suffering slight additional damage from the plane′s machine guns.

Ro-44 reached Kure on 29 April 1944 and began repairs and an overhaul, during which a Type 13 air-search radar was installed. After the work was complete, she departed Kure on 15 May 1944 and arrived at Saipan in the Mariana Islands on 19 May 1944.

Second war patrol

On 23 May 1944, Ro-44 put to sea from Saipan to begin her second war patrol. Her orders called for her to conduct a periscope reconnaissance of Eniwetok, which she did on 10 June 1944. After reporting what she had seen, she made for her assigned patrol area northeast of Eniwetok.

On 13 June 1944 the Combined Fleet activated Operation A-Go for the defense of the Mariana Islands, and that day the commander-in-chief of the 6th Fleet, Vice Admiral Takeo Takagi, ordered all available Japanese submarines to deploy east of the Marianas. Ro-44 was among them, receiving orders to proceed to the waters east of the Marianas at flank speed. The Battle of Saipan began with U.S. landings on Saipan on 15 June 1944, and Ro-44 transmitted a routine situation report that day. The Japanese never heard from her again.

Loss

When Ro-44 did not reply, Burden R. Hastings fired four star shells to illuminate the area, and as the second shell burst, Ro-44 crash-dived.

Nine seconds later, her crew observed a bioluminescent flash in the water and felt a heavy underwater explosion. Five seconds after the last depth charge detonated, another large underwater explosion shook Burden R. Hastings, knocking out some of her electrical equipment. One of her boats recovered debris which identified the sunken submarine as Ro-44.

On the day she was sunk, Ro-44 was ordered to move to a new patrol area southeast of the Marianas. She did not acknowledge the orders, and on 12 July 1944 the Imperial Japanese Navy declared her to be presumed lost off Saipan with the loss of all 72 men on board. She was stricken from the Navy list on 10 August 1944.

Notes

References
 

 

Ro-35-class submarines
Kaichū type submarines
Ships built by Mitsui Engineering and Shipbuilding
1942 ships
World War II submarines of Japan
Japanese submarines lost during World War II
World War II shipwrecks in the Pacific Ocean
Maritime incidents in June 1944
Ships lost with all hands
Submarines sunk by United States warships